The 9th Cortes Generales comprised both the lower (Congress) and upper (Senate) houses of the legislature of Spain following the 2008 general election on 9 March 2008. They first convened on 1 April 2008, and were dissolved on 27 September 2011.

Congress of Deputies

Composition

Members 

Members of the Cortes Generales